The Curtain Pole is a 1909 American comedy film directed by  D. W. Griffith. A print of the film still exists. The film was made by the American Mutoscope and Biograph Company when it and many other early film studios in America's first motion picture industry were based in Fort Lee, New Jersey at the beginning of the 20th century.

Cast 
 Mack Sennett as Monsieur Dupont
 Harry Solter as Mr. Edwards
 Florence Lawrence as Mrs. Edwards

See also
 List of American films of 1909
 D. W. Griffith filmography

References

External links

The Curtain Pole available for free download at the Internet Archive

1909 films
1909 comedy films
1909 short films
1909 directorial debut films
Silent American comedy films
American silent short films
American black-and-white films
Films directed by D. W. Griffith
Films shot in Fort Lee, New Jersey
Articles containing video clips
American comedy short films
1900s American films